Real and fictional characters with Cruz as a first or last name. Cruz is a surname of Iberian origin.

Ted Cruz

Cruz or La Cruz may also refer to:

Places
Brazil:
 Cruz, Ceará, a municipality in the state of Ceará, 
 Osvaldo Cruz, a municipality and county in the state of São Paulo

Chile:
 La Cruz, Chile, a city in the Quillota province, Valparaíso region

Costa Rica:
 La Cruz Canton, a canton in the province of Guanacaste
 La Cruz District, a district of and the capital of La Cruz canton, in the Guanacaste province

Mexico:
 La Cruz Municipality, one of the 67 municipalities of the state of Chihuahua
 La Cruz, Chihuahua, a town in La Cruz municipality, Chihuahua
 La Cruz, Sinaloa, a small city in Elota municipality, Sinaloa
 La Cruz, Tamaulipas, a community in Nuevo Laredo municipality, Tamaulipas
 La Cruz de Huanacaxtle, a village in Bahía de Banderas municipality, Nayarit

Peru:
 La Cruz District, Tumbes, a district of Tumbes province, in the Tumbes region

Portugal:
 Achadas da Cruz, parish in the district of Porto Moniz, Madeira
 Cruz, Vila Nova de Famalicão, parish in the municipality of Vila Nova de Famalicão
 Porto da Cruz, parish in the district of Machico, Madeira

Puerto Rico
 Cruz, Moca, Puerto Rico, barrio in the municipality of Moca, in Puerto Rico

Spain:
 Puerto de la Cruz, a city on the island of Tenerife

United States:
 Cruz Bay, a city on the island of St. John in the U.S. Virgin Islands

Uruguay:
 La Cruz, Florida a town in the department of Florida

Venezuela:
 Puerto la Cruz, a coastal city in the state of Anzoátegui

Other
 Cruz, a 1998 Mexican film
 Cruz Records, an American record label
 Cruz Azul, a Mexican football team
 Oswaldo Cruz Foundation, a biomedical research institute in Brazil
 Ilha de Vera Cruz (Island of the True Cross), the first name given to Brazil by early Portuguese explorers
 La cruz (film), a 1997 Argentine film
 USS Point Cruz, an escort aircraft carrier of the U.S. Navy commissioned just after World War II
 Cruz (Velocity Micro), a line of Android-based e-book readers and tablet PCs by Velocity Micro
 "Cruz", a song by Christina Aguilera from Stripped

See also
 De La Cruz
 Santa Cruz (disambiguation)
 Veracruz (disambiguation)
 Crus (disambiguation)
 Cruise (disambiguation)
 Kruz (disambiguation)